The California Color Guard Circuit (CCGC) is one of the many winter guard circuits that are part of Winter Guard International (WGI). Established in 1964, the CCGC was started by six (6) charter members: Sacramento Capitolaires, Stockton Police Cadets, Raleys Raiders, Richmond Hawks, Praetorians, and the Rhythmettes. CCGC membership represents many scholastic programs and independent programs throughout Northern California and Nevada. In 2016, the circuit had just over sixty guard units and around sixteen percussion units. Evaluations are typically held in January; guard units are evaluated in the beginning of January, whereas percussion groups are evaluated towards the end of January. The typical season goes from January to the end of March or beginning of April. Shows are generally held in the San Francisco Bay area and the Sacramento area, though the circuit is based out of Santa Clara County. Each year CCGC holds its own championships and sends many groups to the world championships at WGI. CCGC is the proud home of many WGI medalists including:
 James Logan High School;
 San Jose Raiders;
 Blue Devils;
 Dublin High School;
 Santa Clara Vanguard;
 Clayton Valley High School;
 Amador Valley High School;
 Johansen High School;
 Freelancers;
 Ventura; and
 In Motion.
This long list shows that CCGC is, indeed, the Circuit of Champions.

2016 CCGC Color Guard Members

Past Class Champions - Color Guard

2015 - March 28, 2015 
 Scholastic Regional Middle School - Ida Price Middle School (74.38)
 Scholastic Regional "A" - Gonzales High School (81.15)
 Independent Regional "A" - Irvington (61.77)
 Scholastic "A" - Independence High School (79.78)
 Scholastic "AA" - Amador Valley High School A (84.48)
 Independent "A" - In Motion (80.72)
 Scholastic Open - Oak Grove (82.30)
 Independent Open - Dynasty (65.70)
 Scholastic World - James Logan High School World (90.60)
 Independent World - Infinitus (72.10)

WGI Gold Medalists from CCGC 
James Logan High School (1998*tie, 1999, 2000, 2001, 2002, 2003, 2004, 2005, 2006, 2007, 2010)
San Jose Raiders (1990*tie, 1991, 1992, 1993, 1994, 2003)
Blue Devils (1995, 1996, 1997, 1998)
Johansen High School Percussion (1998 Scholastic A)
Abraham Lincoln (1988 scholastic "A")
Santa Clara Vanguard 2009, 2011

2014 Executive Board 

President- Lee Carpenter
Contest Coordinator- Dee Ariza
Treasurer- Sandy Montana
Secretary- Mona Schlieper
Parliamentarian- Sharon Gordon

External links

CCGC Site
WGI Official Site

Arts organizations based in California
Organizations established in 1964
1964 establishments in California